Karanjali is a small village in Ratnagiri district, Maharashtra state in Western India.This village also known as Black Rice village. The young engineer Mr. Abhishek surve has produced maharastras first Black rice cultivation. The 2011 Census of India recorded a total of 790 residents in the village.

References

Villages in Ratnagiri district